3-Methylornithine is an amino acid with the formula H2N(CH2)2CH(CH3)CH(NH2)CO2H.  This amino acid contains two stereogenic centers, but only one stereoisomer (namely (3R)-3-methyl-D-ornithine) occurs in nature. It is produced from lysine by the action of the enzyme methylornithine synthase.  The combination of lysine and 3-methylornithine, also mediated enzymatically, produces pyrrolysine, which, for a few organisms, is a "22nd" genetically coded amino acid.

References

Basic amino acids
Diamines